Tomás Torres Mercado (December 15, 1960 – October 22, 2015) was a Mexican politician affiliated with the Ecologist Green Party of Mexico (PVEM) who served as Federal Deputy for the 2012-2015 period.

He was previously elected to serve as senator from 2006 to 2012.

Biography 

Torres Mercado served in the cabinet of Governor Ricardo Monreal; he also served as a federal deputy in the Chamber of Deputies of Mexico during the LVIII Legislature.

He was expelled from the party in November 2010. He died on October 22, 2015 at the age of 54.

References 

1960 births
2015 deaths
Party of the Democratic Revolution politicians
Members of the Chamber of Deputies (Mexico)
Presidents of the Chamber of Deputies (Mexico)
Members of the Senate of the Republic (Mexico)
21st-century Mexican politicians